Paul Adam (born 1958 in Coventry) is an English writer of novels for both adults and younger readers.

Adam moved to Sheffield before the age of one. He studied law at the University of Nottingham, then began a career in journalism, working both in England, in his childhood town of Sheffield, and Rome. Since then he has written 11 critically acclaimed thrillers for adults and the Max Cassidy series of thrillers for younger readers about a teenage escapologist, the first of which, Escape from Shadow Island, won the Salford Children's Book Award. He has also written film and television scripts.

Adam lived in Nottingham for many years but now lives in Sheffield with his wife and two children.

Works 

 An Exceptional Corpse (1993)
 A Nasty Dose of Death (1994)
 Toxin (1995)
 Unholy Trinity (1999)
 Shadow Chasers (2000)
 Genesis II (2001)
 Flash Point aka Oracle Lake (2003)
 Sleeper aka The Rainaldi Quartet (2004)
 Enemy Within (2005)
 Knife Edge (2008)
 Escape From Shadow Island (2009)
 Paganini's Ghost: A Mystery (2010)
 Jaws of Death (2011)
 Attack at Dead Man's Bay (2012)
 Dixieland (2013)
 The Hardanger Riddle (2019)

References 
 http://www.pauladam.com/
 https://web.archive.org/web/20110225210648/http://unitedagents.co.uk/paul-adam#profile-3
 http://www.fantasticfiction.co.uk/a/paul-adam/
 https://web.archive.org/web/20071009230624/http://tracearchive.ntu.ac.uk/em/directory/a.htm
 http://www.salford.gov.uk/2010bookaward.htm

External links 
 http://www.pauladam.com/
 Book Reviews

1958 births
Living people
Alumni of the University of Nottingham
English thriller writers
Writers from Nottingham
Writers from Sheffield
People from Coventry
20th-century English novelists
21st-century English novelists
English male novelists
20th-century English male writers
21st-century English male writers